Longbridge railway station serves the Longbridge area in the south-west of Birmingham, England. It is on the Cross City Line. The station and all trains calling there are operated by West Midlands Trains.

History
Two previous stations serving Longbridge have existed: The first was opened at a location just south of the current station in either 1840 or 1841, when the original Birmingham and Gloucester Railway opened, it did not prosper and closed in 1849. 

Another Longbridge station had existed nearby, on the Halesowen Railway branch to Old Hill: this station only ever served workman's trains, and operated between 1915 and 1964. Until closure of much of the Longbridge factory, the disused track and Longbridge station building remained in situ.

The current station, on Tessall Lane, was built to the designs of the architect John Broome and opened in 1978 under the auspices of British Rail, as part of the West Midlands Passenger Transport Executive's Cross-City Line scheme. It was built as a simple two platform station on the four-track line, with a turnback siding just south of the station for terminating services. The line was electrified in 1993.

Services
During Monday-Saturday daytimes, northbound trains operate every 10 minutes with two trains per hour to Four Oaks, two to Lichfield City and two through to Lichfield Trent Valley. Southbound trains operate every 20 minutes to Redditch and every 20 minutes to Bromsgrove.  On Sundays, trains operate every 30 minutes between Redditch and Lichfield.

Services are operated by Class 323 electric multiple units. Three trains per hour operate to/from Bromsgrove Mon-Sat and two each way per hour on Sundays (the latter start/terminate at New Street).

Disabled access
The ticket office and footbridge have level access from Longbridge Lane. Platform 1 (for trains towards ) has step-free access by means of a lift from the footbridge, and platform 2 (for trains towards ) has a ramp from the footbridge to platform level.

References

External links

Rail Around Birmingham and the West Midlands: Longbridge railway station
Warwickshire Railways page

Railway stations in Birmingham, West Midlands
DfT Category E stations
Former Midland Railway stations
Railway stations in Great Britain opened in 1841
Railway stations in Great Britain closed in 1849
Railway stations in Great Britain opened in 1978
Railway stations served by West Midlands Trains
1841 establishments in England
John Broome railway stations